6a architects is a British architectural practice, which was established in 2001 by Stephanie Macdonald and Tom Emerson. It is based in London, United Kingdom.

The practice won the RIBA National Award in 2011, 2017, 2018, 2019, 2021 and it was awarded the Erich Schelling Medal for Architecture in 2012.

The practice 
Established in 2001, 6a architects is associated with projects for cultural institutions such as art galleries, collaborations with artists and residential buildings. It was founded by life and business partners Stephanie Macdonald and Tom Emerson, who met at the Royal College of Art in 1994. Speaking on why they decided to form the practice, Macdonald has said that it was as a way to balance the responsibilities of childcare and work, after their son was born in 1999.

The practice’s first project was a showroom in Mayfair for the online fashion retailer Oki-ni. This was followed by several projects involving art galleries including Raven Row gallery in East London in 2009 and the expansion of the South London Gallery in 2010. The practice was enlisted to work on the South London Gallery Fire Station, completed in 2018. Subsequently, the practice designed the new MK Gallery in Milton Keynes, which opened in 2019. The gallery was listed in second place in The Guardian's top ten architecture 2019 list and at number one in Rowan Moore's 'top 5 buildings of 2019' in The Observer. International projects have included multi-use towers in the Hafen district of Hamburg, Germany, completed in 2020.

Awards and nominations 
The practice has received several awards, nominations and been on various shortlists. For Juergen Teller’s studio, the practice was awarded the RIBA London Building of the Year 2017, a RIBA National Award, a RIBA regional award and it was shortlisted for the RIBA Stirling prize. It was awarded the Woods Award for Coastal House in Devon. There have also been three nominations for the European Union Prize for Contemporary Architecture – Mies Van der Rohe Award, in 2011, 2013 and 2015. The Evening Standard listed Macdonald and Emerson on London’s most influential people in 2018 in the category of architecture. The practice was cited as one of Domus's best architecture firms in 2020.

Founders Macdonald and Emerson were both appointed Officer of the Order of the British Empire (OBE) in the 2021 New Years Honours for their services to architecture.

Notable works 

 Oki-ni, Savile Row, London, 2001
 Raven Row, Contemporary Art Exhibition Centre, Spitalfields, London, 2009
 South London Gallery, London, 2010
 Fashion Galleries, Victoria & Albert Museum, London, 2012
 Romney's House, Hampstead, London, 2012
 Tree House, London, London, 2013
 Façade for Paul Smith, Albemarle Street, London, 2013
 Studio for Juergen Teller, London, 2016
 Cowan Court, Churchill College Cambridge, 2015–16
 Black Stone Building, London, 2017
 Coastal House, Devon, 2017
 Blue Mountain School, London, 2018
 MK Gallery, Milton Keynes, 2019
 Housing, Hafen City, Hamburg, 2020
 A2-B2, Design District London, 2021
 Bedford House Community Centre, London 2021

Bibliography 

 Never Modern by 6a architects and Irénée Scalbert, Park Books, Zurich, 2013, 
 6a architects 2009–17, El Croquis, no. 192, 2017, 
 6a architects 2001–22, A+U, no. 623, 2022,

See also 

 List of architecture firms
 List of architects

References

External links 

 Practice website

Architecture firms based in London
Companies established in 2001
2001 establishments in England